Joseph Bell DeRemer (1871–1944), who lived and worked in  Grand Forks, North Dakota, was one of the finest architects in North Dakota.  Some of the important works produced by him or his firm, which included his son Samuel Teel DeRemer, include the President's House at the University of North Dakota, the Masonic Temple, and the Art Moderne United Lutheran Church and North Dakota State Capitol skyscraper. Joseph DeRemer also designed houses in the Grand Forks Near Southside Historic District, most notably the Tudor Revival house presently located at 521 South Sixth Street off Reeves Drive.  His significant works include a number of buildings that are listed on the U.S. National Register of Historic Places.

Personal life
Joseph Bell DeRemer was born in New Jersey on September 14, 1871, and studied one year at Columbia University. He married Elizabeth M. DeRemer (1872 - February 10, 1965) in New Jersey. They were the parents of Samuel Teel DeRemer. He died on February 16, 1944, in Grand Forks and was buried in Memorial Park Cemetery in Grand Forks, North Dakota. His wife and son were later buried next to him.

The DeRemers also had a daughter, Dolores, who was a pianist and married William Pendry Bidelman. The DeRemers raised their grandson, William Pendry Bidelman, who became an astronomer.

Samuel Teel DeRemer
Samuel Teel DeRemer was born May 15, 1894, in New Jersey and died September 18, 1967, in Bemidji, Minnesota. He joined his father Joseph Bell DeRemer's architectural practice in 1920.

Works
Works by Joseph Bell DeRemer by year include:
Oxford House, University of North Dakota campus, 1902
St. Paul's Episcopal Church, 404 DeSmet St., now 312 2nd Ave., S.W;, Rugby, North Dakota
New Hampshire Apartments, 105 N. 3rd St.,  Grand Forks, North Dakota, 1904
George B. Clifford House, 406 Reeves Dr.,  Grand Forks, North Dakota, first floor redesign and addition, 1906
Joseph Bell DeRemer House, 625 Belmont Rd.,  Grand Forks, North Dakota, 1906
North Dakota Museum of Art, University of North Dakota campus, 1907
Gustafson Hall, University of North Dakota campus, 1908
Babcock Hall, University of North Dakota campus, 1908
Dickinson (Carnegie Area) Public Library, 139 3rd St. W., Dickinson, North Dakota
Franklin School, 308 Second St. SW, Jamestown, North Dakota
One or more properties included in Grand Forks Near Southside Historic District, Roughly bounded by ND 697, Red River, 13th Ave. and Cottonwood St.,  Grand Forks, North Dakota
Masonic Temple, 413-421 Bruce Ave, 1913
St. Catherine's Church of Lomice, North Dakota,  4 mi. W and 2 mi. S of jct. ND 35 and Cty Rte 15 Whitman, North Dakota
K. J. Taralseth Company, 427 N. Main St. Warren, Minnesota
Merrifield Hall, University of North Dakota campus, 1929
United Lutheran Church, 324 Chestnut St. (with his son Samuel T. DeRemer), 1931–41
B'nai Israel Synagogue, Grand Forks, North Dakota, 1937

References

External links

20th-century American architects
1871 births
1944 deaths
People from Grand Forks, North Dakota
Columbia University alumni
 
Architects from New Jersey
Architects from North Dakota